The 2011 Irwin Tools Night Race was a stock car racing competition that took place on August 27, 2011. Held at Bristol Motor Speedway in Bristol, Tennessee, the 500-lap race was the twenty-fourth in the 2011 NASCAR Sprint Cup Series. Brad Keselowski of the Penske Racing team won the race; Martin Truex Jr. finished second and Jeff Gordon finished third.

Report

Background

Bristol Motor Speedway is one of five short tracks to hold NASCAR races; the others are Richmond International Raceway, Dover International Speedway, Martinsville Speedway, and Phoenix International Raceway. The track's turns are banked from twenty-four to thirty degrees, while the front stretch, the location of the finish line, is banked from six to ten degrees. The back stretch also has banking from six to ten degrees.

Before the race, Kyle Busch led the Drivers' Championship with 799 points, and Jimmie Johnson stood in second with 789 points. Kevin Harvick was third in the Drivers' Championship with 760 points, and Carl Edwards was fourth with 760 points. Matt Kenseth, Jeff Gordon, Ryan Newman, Kurt Busch, Dale Earnhardt Jr. and Tony Stewart rounded out the first ten positions. Kyle Busch was the race's defending champion.

On August 23, 2011, Toyota debuted the 2012 Toyota Camry at Paramount Studios in Hollywood, California, prompting the Toyota teams to  change their headlights, taillights, fog lights, and rear decals.

Race

The race was televised by ABC in the United States. However, several affiliates including ABC owned-and-operated WABC in New York City, WPVI in Philadelphia and WTVD in Raleigh-Durham pre-empted the race in order to offer continuing coverage of Hurricane Irene, while other ABC affiliates pre-empted this race to air NFL preseason games.

Results

Race

Standings after the race

Drivers' Championship standings

Manufacturers' Championship standings

Note: Only the first ten positions are included for the Drivers' Championship.

References

Irwin Tools Night Race
Irwin Tools Night Race
NASCAR races at Bristol Motor Speedway
August 2011 sports events in the United States